The Lebanese Social Democratic Party is a party founded and led by former Lebanese speaker of parliament Kamel Bek El-Assaad. The party was founded in June 1970.

Names 
 

Ideology 

 The Social Democratic Party was officially declared secular. However, the majority of its supporters are of Muslim faith.
 The promotion of modern-shiasm, Islamized socialism and lastly, democracy.
 An Independent Lebanon with full sovereignty and unity.   
 Promotes arab nationalism in Lebanon, while appreciating the Phoenician history and origin. 
 Believes in brotherhood towards neighboring arab countries. 
 Appreciates the coexistence of all religions and their sects in Lebanon. 
 The government should serve the people, not the other way around. 
 The country should remain under one military power, and all parties must disarm.

Kamel Bek El-Assaad

Kamel Bek served starting early 1960 as Deputy (Member of the Lebanese Parliament) of Bint Jbeil, succeeding his father late Ahmed Asaad and then held the parliamentary seat of Hasbaya-Marjayoun from 1964 and 1992. He was elected Speaker of the Lebanese Parliament several times, May to October 1964, May to October 1968, with his final stint from 1970 to 1984. Assaad chaired the parliamentary sessions, which saw the election of presidents Elias Sarkis, Bachir Gemayel, and Amine Gemayel.

Assaad left politics in 1984 after Syria's intervention in Lebanon's internal political policies related to the ratification of the Agreement of May 17, 1984, between Israel and Lebanon, and the period of political crisis which followed.

He also had ministerial positions in two Lebanese governments serving as Minister of Education and Fine Arts from October 1961 to February 1964, and as Minister of Health and Minister of Water and Electricity Resources from April to December 1966.

After serving as a Member of Parliament and its Speaker several times, Assaad later ran for public office but failed to get elected in the Lebanese elections in 1992, 1996 and 2000, in the face of pro-Syrian and pro-Iranian political groups Amal and Hezbollah lists, and called for a boycott of the elections in 2005. He died in 2010, at the age of 78.

Relations 

The party is hostile to Hezbollah and Amal movement, and most of their supporters are from the Lebanese Shi'a community, specifically those loyal to the House of El-Assaad. The party was neutral with most parties, and was in good relation with President Bashir Gemayel leader of the Lebanese Kateab Party.

Conflict 

After the Death of Kamel Bek El-Assaad, Lina Saad, his second wife, took leadership of the party. This led to conflict, then his first wife Ghada Al-Kharsa and her son, Ahmed El-Assaad, started their own party; The Lebanese Option Party. Many believe that the Lebanese Option Party does not represent the El-Assaad Family or the Lebanese Social Democratic Party in any way.

Current Status 

The party does not have any members in parliament. It still attends and hosts charities, gatherings and political meetings. However, it still waits for a new leader from the El-Assaad Family. It is expected that one of Kamel Bek El Assaad's sons from his second wife, will have leadership eventually. Currently, Lina Saad is in-charge of the party and proceeds to handle all its internal and external relations.

See also

 Political parties in Lebanon
 El Assaad Family 
 Lebanese Shia Muslims
 May 17 Agreement
 Legislative Speaker of Lebanon
 1968 Lebanese general election in Marjeyoun-Hasbaya
 Kamel El Assaad
 List of legislative speakers of Lebanon
 Ahmed El Assaad
 Tebnine

References

1970 establishments in Lebanon
Arab nationalism in Lebanon
Arab nationalist political parties
Nationalist parties in Lebanon
Political parties established in 1970
Political parties in Lebanon
Social democratic parties in Lebanon